Amblyseius strobocorycus is a species of mite in the family Phytoseiidae.

References

strobocorycus
Articles created by Qbugbot
Animals described in 1995